The 1921 Howard Bulldogs football team was an American football team that represented Howard College (now known as the Samford University) as a member of the Southern Intercollegiate Athletic Association (SIAA) during the 1921 college football season. In their second year under head coach Robert C. Marshall, the team compiled a 3–6 record.

Schedule

References

Howard
Samford Bulldogs football seasons
Howard Bulldogs football